The Kangaroo Cup is a tournament for professional female tennis players played on outdoor hard courts. The event is classified as a $80,000 ITF Women's Circuit tournament and has been held in Gifu, Japan, since 1997.

Past finals

Singles

Doubles

External links 
 ITF search 

 
ITF Women's World Tennis Tour
Hard court tennis tournaments
Tennis tournaments in Japan
Recurring sporting events established in 1997